Poa colensoi, the blue tussock, is a species of cool-season grass in the family Poaceae, endemic to New Zealand. It is considered the native grass species with the highest potential for use in high altitude livestock grazing systems, as it has good palatibility and above average regrowth rates.

References

colensoi
Endemic flora of New Zealand
Grasses of New Zealand
Flora of the North Island
Flora of the South Island
Plants described in 1864